Amblyseius oatmani is a species of mites in the Phytoseiidae family. It was described by Denmark in 1974.

References

oatmani
Animals described in 1974
Arachnids of Europe